First We Feast is an online food-culture magazine and YouTube channel. The site co-produces the YouTube series Hot Ones with Complex Media, its parent company.

Description
First We Feast began in 2012 as a food culture blog edited by Chris Schonberger, who had formerly worked for TONY. The blog was an off-branch of Complex magazine. The website gained a measure of popularity, and began to incorporate interviews and cooking guides into its website. In 2014 the website launched its YouTube channel, which produces a number of food-related video series, most notably Hot Ones, The Curry Shop, The Burger Show (hosted by Alvin Cailan) and Burger Scholar Sessions (hosted by George Motz).

References

External links
Official Website

American cooking websites
Food and cooking YouTube channels
Internet properties established in 2012